Ercüment Olgundeniz (born July 7, 1976 in Izmir) is a Turkish track and field athlete competing in the discus and occasionally shot put.

He took part at the 2004 Summer Olympics in Athens, Greece. With his throw of 58.17 m, Olgundeniz ranked 28th and could not qualify for the finals. In 2005, he participated at the Mediterranean Games in Almería, and won the bronze medal with his performance of 59.16 m. He was ranked 44th in the world best list in 2004 with his personal record of 63.49 metres (Turkish record) set on July 4, 2004 in Istanbul.

In March 2007 in Yalta he improved the record to 64.34 metres. He competed at the 2007 World Championships, but finished last and did not reach the final.

Ercüment Olgundeniz won the silver medal at the 2009 Mediterranean Games held in Pescara, Italy.

On May 27, 2012, he improved his national record from 66.89 m set in 2011 to 67.50 m at the European Champion Clubs Cup held in Vila Real de Santo António, Portugal winning the silver medal.

He qualified for participation in the discus throw event at the 2012 Summer Olympics, but did not reach the final.

At the 2013 Mediterranean Games held in Mersin, Turkey, he became silver medalist in the discus event.

Achievements

References

External links

1976 births
Living people
Fenerbahçe athletes
Enkaspor athletes
Turkish male discus throwers
Athletes (track and field) at the 2004 Summer Olympics
Athletes (track and field) at the 2008 Summer Olympics
Olympic athletes of Turkey
Sportspeople from İzmir
Athletes (track and field) at the 2012 Summer Olympics
Mediterranean Games silver medalists for Turkey
Mediterranean Games bronze medalists for Turkey
Athletes (track and field) at the 2005 Mediterranean Games
Athletes (track and field) at the 2009 Mediterranean Games
Athletes (track and field) at the 2013 Mediterranean Games
Mediterranean Games medalists in athletics
20th-century Turkish people
21st-century Turkish people